Naiade was one of a dozen s, the second sub-class of the 600 Series of coastal submarines built for the  (Royal Italian Navy) during the early 1930s.

Design and description
The Sirena class was an improved and enlarged version of the preceding s. They displaced  surfaced and  submerged. Their crew numbered 45 officers and enlisted men.

For surface running, the boats were powered by two  diesel engines, each driving one propeller shaft. When submerged each propeller was driven by a  electric motor. They could reach  on the surface and  underwater.

The boats were armed with six  torpedo tubes, four in the bow and two in the stern for which they carried a total of 12 torpedoes. They were also armed with a single  deck gun forward of the conning tower for combat on the surface. The anti-aircraft armament consisted of two or four  machine guns.

Construction and career
Naiade was laid down by Cantieri Riuniti dell'Adriatico at their Monfalcone shipyard in 1931, launched on 27 March 1933 and completed the following year.

Notes

References

External links
 Sommergibili Marina Militare website

Sirena-class submarines
World War II submarines of Italy
1933 ships